5th Avenue station (also called C-3 station) is a railway station located on the North Main Line in Caloocan, Metro Manila, Philippines. Facilities such as ramps and platforms were planned to be constructed near the level crossing with C-3 Road. The plans to rehabilitate this part of PNR's network were implemented but no concrete platforms were erected.

PNR opened the 5th Avenue station as part of Caloocan-Dela Rosa line on August 1, 2018. It is a brand new stop for the line as it was not a designated station before in the line's history. As there are no platforms yet being erected, temporary stairs for the trains are added in the meantime to facilitate loading and unloading.

The new elevated expressway for NLEX Harbor Link is located immediately beside the railway station, with neighboring houses demolished for the construction, reducing the rail tracks to 1. A further extension will be covered by the NLEX Connector project, currently under construction.

Station Layout

References

Philippine National Railways stations
Railway stations in Metro Manila
Buildings and structures in Caloocan